Zichya may refer to two living genera: 
 Zichya, an insect in the family Tettigoniidae
 Zichya a synonym for Kennedia, an evergreen plant endemic to Australia;